Ilinden, also known as Makedonium ( or ), is a monument in Kruševo, North Macedonia. It was officially opened on August 2 of 1974, on the 30th anniversary of the Second Session of the Anti-fascist Assembly for the National Liberation of Macedonia and the 71st anniversary of the 1903 Ilinden uprising. The designers of the monument are Jordan Grabuloski and Iskra Grabuloska.

It is dedicated to all the IMARO revolutionaries who participated in the Ilinden uprising, as well as communist Yugoslav partisans of the World War II in Yugoslav Macedonia (1941-1944).

Description 
The monument's grounds cover . The building has a rounded shape with protruding oval windows. The upper windows are made of stained glass. 

Inside the dome is the tomb of Nikola Karev, president of the Kruševo Republic, and the bust of the singer Toše Proeski. The interior of the dome has four windows, each facing a different direction including the locations associated with the Ilinden-related events ″Sliva″ Memorial, Bear stone and Pelagonija.

The memorial complex also features a plateau with series of sculptures named "Breaking the Chains", symbolizing freedom won in the liberation wars. There is also a crypt with the carved names and important events related to the period before, during and after the Ilinden uprising. The last component is the amphitheater decorated with colorful mosaics.

Gallery

See also 
Kruševo Republic
List of World War II monuments and memorials in North Macedonia

References

External links 

Buildings and structures completed in 1974
Monuments and memorials in North Macedonia
1974 sculptures
Kruševo Municipality
1974 establishments in Yugoslavia